Hrvatska pošta Mostar (English: Croatian Post Mostar) is one of three companies responsible for postal service in Bosnia and Herzegovina. It operates mainly in Croat-majority areas in the Federation of Bosnia and Herzegovina and its headquarters are in Mostar. It was established in 1993. The other two postal operators in the country are BH Pošta (covering the majority of other customers in the Federation of Bosnia and Herzegovina) and Pošte Srpske (operating in Republika Srpska).

External links

Companies based in Mostar
Communications in Bosnia and Herzegovina
Companies of Bosnia and Herzegovina
Bosnia and Herzegovina
Philately of Bosnia and Herzegovina
Government-owned companies of Bosnia and Herzegovina